The olive tanager (Chlorothraupis carmioli), also known as Carmiol's tanager, is a species of bird traditionally placed in the family Thraupidae (tanagers), though molecular evidence indicates it should be placed in Cardinalidae (cardinals). This bird's natural habitats are subtropical or tropical moist lowland forests and heavily degraded former forest.

Taxonomy
Some authorities advocate splitting this species into two. Carmiol's tanager (C. carmioli, including subspecies magnirostris and lutescens) is found in Nicaragua, Costa Rica, Panama and far north-western Colombia (near the Panama border). The name commemorates the German scientist Julian Carmiol who worked in Costa Rica. The other species would be the olive tanager (C. frenata), which is found locally in the Andes of Colombia, Ecuador, Peru and Bolivia.

Description
The upper parts are a dull olive green, and the underparts are a rather paler olive green. The throat is slightly yellower than the rest of the underparts, and is streaked in the male while being a uniform pale yellow in the female. The underparts of the female are paler than those of the male, and the female has a yellowish patch in front of the eyes. The beak is relatively stout and is dark-coloured in both sexes. The lemon-spectacled tanager looks similar, apart from its yellow facial markings, but does not share the same range as the olive tanager. Also similar is the ochre-breasted tanager (Chlorothraupis stolzmanni) but again the ranges do not overlap.

Ecology
The olive tanager is a gregarious bird and often forms noisy groups of a few dozen birds, sometimes including birds of other species such as the tawny-crested tanager (Tachyphonus delatrii). In Panama a typical call is a repeated "zhwek-zhwek-zhwek" but this song is replaced in Bolivia by a more melodious series of about eight notes, this being repeated several times before going on to a different phrase.

The olive tanager feeds on small insects such as beetles, cockroaches and crickets, supplementing these with berries. Breeding takes place between March and May and the nest is a cup-shaped construction of plant fibres and mosses.

Status
The population of this bird has not been quantified but the total number of birds is thought to be declining. However, the bird is common in some areas of its extensive range, and the International Union for Conservation of Nature considers its conservation status to be of  "least concern".

References

olive tanager
Birds of Nicaragua
Birds of Costa Rica
Birds of Panama
Birds of the Northern Andes
olive tanager
Taxonomy articles created by Polbot
Taxobox binomials not recognized by IUCN